Texas A&M School of Medicine is the medical school at Texas A&M University.  The School offers M.D., M.D./Ph.D., M.D./M.P.H, M.D./M.B.A., M.D./M.Eng., and several other M.D./M.S. dual degree programs.

History 
Founded as the Texas A&M College of Medicine in 1977, the charter class of 32 students began their medical training on Texas A&M University's campus. 1981 marked the year the first medical degrees were awarded, and since then, more than 2,258 physicians have graduated from Texas A&M School of Medicine. In 1999, the College joined the newly created Texas A&M Health Science Center. During a series of Texas A&M organizational changes in 2021, the College of Medicine was redesignated the School of Medicine.

Training Facilities and Curriculum

The School's mission is to improve the health and well-being of the people of Texas through excellence in education, research and health care delivery. The MD curriculum consists of 1.5 years of pre-clinical curriculum followed by 2.5 years of clinical training.

Campus Tracks 
The School of Medicine operates 5 different campus tracks: 4 different sites around the state for the regular MD students and one site for the EnMed MD/MEng students.

Research Centers, Institutes & Labs

Houston Methodist Hospital
Cardiovascular Research Institute
Center for Airborne Pathogen Research and Tuberculosis Imaging
Center for Health Systems and Design
Center for Microencapsulation and Drug Delivery
Huffines Institute for Sports Medicine and Human Performance
Institute for Ocular Pharmacology
Institute for Regenerative Medicine
The Texas Brain and Spine Institute

Notable physicians and researchers

Mark M. Shelton, (MD Class of 1983), specialist in infectious diseases and pediatric AIDS at Cook Children's Medical Center in Fort Worth; Republican member of the Texas House of Representatives, 2009-2013
Robert Stone (scientist),  Director of The National Institutes of Health from 1973 to 1975; the vice president for health services and dean of the school of medicine at the University of New Mexico, dean of the School of Medicine of the University of Oregon Health Sciences Center and vice president of the Health Sciences Center, and dean of the Texas A&M Health Science Center College of Medicine.

References

Medicine
Medical schools in Texas
Education in Bell County, Texas
Education in Brazos County, Texas
Education in Williamson County, Texas